Sistani is an Arabic surname. Notable people with the surname include:

Ali al-Sistani (born 1930), Iranian religious leader
Farrukhi Sistani ( 980–1037 or 1038), Persian poet

Arabic-language surnames